is a Japanese voice actress who is affiliated with Raccoon Dog. She played her first major role as Hibiki Sakura, the protagonist of the 2019 anime series How Heavy Are the Dumbbells You Lift?. She also played Emily Orange in the 2019 anime series Kandagawa Jet Girls, Eripiyo in the 2020 anime series If My Favorite Pop Idol Made It to the Budokan, I Would Die, Jolyne Cujoh in the 2021 anime series JoJo's Bizarre Adventure: Stone Ocean and Power in the 2022 anime series Chainsaw Man.

Biography
 was born on 6 July 1993 in Tokyo to a Japanese mother and an Egyptian father. She was named after the Lebanese singer Fairuz. She spent a few years of her elementary education at Cairo Japanese School before returning to Japan. During her junior high school years, she became familiar with the manga series JoJo's Bizarre Adventure. Due to her growing interest in the series, she would join Skype reading sessions with other fans. Eventually, she was inspired to pursue a career in voice acting, but her parents initially disapproved of her plans. Instead, she would initially study at a graphic design vocational school before spending a year as a dental assistant. Once she was able to save enough money for tuition, she enrolled in a voice acting training school.

After finishing her training, Fairouz became affiliated with the voice acting agency Pro-Fit. In 2019, she was cast in her first major role as Hibiki Sakura, the protagonist of the anime television series How Heavy Are the Dumbbells You Lift?. She and Kaito Ishikawa performed the series' opening theme , and as part of promotions for the series, she would appear in various weightlifting videos. She was cast as Emily Orange in the multimedia franchise Kandagawa Jet Girls and as Eripiyo in the 2020 anime series If My Favorite Pop Idol Made It to the Budokan, I Would Die; she also performed the latter series' ending theme "Momoiro Kataomoi", a cover of a song originally performed by Aya Matsuura.

In 2020, Fairouz was one of the recipients of the Best New Actress Award at the 14th Seiyu Awards. In 2021, she voiced the role of Manatsu Natsuumi/Cure Summer in Tropical-Rouge! Pretty Cure.

On 4 April 2021, Fairouz voiced the role of Jolyne Cujoh in the anime adaptation of the sixth story arc of JoJo's Bizarre Adventure, Stone Ocean.

Following the closure of Pro-Fit on 31 March 2022, Fairouz became affiliated with Raccoon Dog, a voice acting agency founded by voice actor Nobuhiko Okamoto.

Personal life
Her older brother, is an ice climber who represents Japan in competitions.

She is fluent in Arabic (including Egyptian Arabic).

Filmography

TV anime
2019
One-Punch Man as Female Citizen A
Dr. Stone as People of the World 
Is It Wrong to Try to Pick Up Girls in a Dungeon? II as Squad Leader 
How Heavy Are the Dumbbells You Lift? as Hibiki Sakura
Cautious Hero: The Hero Is Overpowered but Overly Cautious as Valkyrie
Kandagawa Jet Girls as Emily Orange

2020
 If My Favorite Pop Idol Made It to the Budokan, I Would Die as Eripiyo
 Kiratto Pri Chan as Alice Kagayaki
 Mewkledreamy as Tokiwa Anzai
 Monster Girl Doctor as Kay Arte
 Yashahime: Princess Half-Demon as Takechiyo
Fruits Basket as Female Student
By the Grace of the Gods as Jane

2021
Tropical-Rouge! Pretty Cure as Manatsu Natsuumi/Cure Summer
Full Dive as Alicia
Tokyo Revengers as Manjirō Sano (young)
Mewkledreamy Mix! as Tokiwa Anzai
Kageki Shojo!! as Sayako Yamada
Rumble Garanndoll as Rin Akagi

2022
Trapped in a Dating Sim: The World of Otome Games Is Tough for Mobs as Angelica Rapha Redgrave
Yu-Gi-Oh! Go Rush!! as Nyandestar
Skeleton Knight in Another World as Arianne Glenys Lalatoya
In the Heart of Kunoichi Tsubaki as Sumire
Shine Post as Remi Nashinoki
The Eminence in Shadow as Delta
Chainsaw Man as Power
Bibliophile Princess as Sophia

2023
Handyman Saitō in Another World as Raelza
Mahō Shōjo Magical Destroyers as Anarchy
Isekai Shōkan wa Nidome Desu as Livaia
New Saga as Lise
The Most Heretical Last Boss Queen as Pride
The Vexations of a Shut-In Vampire Princess as Nelia Cunningham

TBA
I Was Reincarnated as the 7th Prince so I Can Take My Time Perfecting My Magical Ability as Grim

Animated films
 Happy-Go-Lucky Days (2020) as Sayoko

OVAs/ONAs
 Zenonzard: The Animation Episode 0 (2019) as Ruri Minamino
JoJo's Bizarre Adventure: Stone Ocean (2021–22) as Jolyne Cujoh, Jolyne Cujoh Look-alike, Irene

Video games
2019
Fire Emblem Heroes as Phina
Kemono Friends 3 as Reindeer
 MapleStory as female Hoyoung

2020
 White Cat Tennis as Haru
Kandagawa Jet Girls as Emily Orange
Fate/Grand Order as Sei Shōnagon 
KonoSuba: Fantastic Days as Cecily
Marco & the Galaxy Dragon as Ruri
Azur Lane as USS Intrepid (CV-11)
Cytus II as Cherry
Kingdom of Hero as Shiv
Summer Pockets Reflection Blue as Shiki Kamiyama
Dragalia Lost as Nadine
Kantai Collection as USS Hornet (CV-8)
Ano Hi no Tabibito, Fureau Mirai as Tamaki Aoi
Granblue Fantasy as Fiorito 

2021
Magia Record: Puella Magi Madoka Magica Side Story as San Kagura
Epic Seven as Landy
Yuki Yuna is a Hero: Hanayui no Kirameki as Hime Hokkedō
Wonder Boy: Asha in Monster World as Asha, and various other roles
The Legend of Heroes: Kuro no Kiseki as Ashen Lu
Blue Archive as Fuuka Aikiyo
Cookie Run: Kingdom as Mala Sauce Cookie

2022
JoJo's Bizarre Adventure: Last Survivor as Jolyne Cujoh
JoJo's Bizarre Adventure: All Star Battle R as Jolyne Cujoh
Trinity Trigger as Wiz
The Legend of Heroes: Kuro no Kiseki II – Crimson Sin as Celis Ortesia, and Ashen Lu
Star Ocean: The Divine Force as Marielle L. Kenny
Goonya Monster as Pirarucu

2023
Fire Emblem Engage as Yunaka
Octopath Traveler II as Ori
404 Game Re:set as Virtua Fighter

Dubbing

Live-action
The Batman, Selina Kyle / Catwoman (Zoë Kravitz)
Black Christmas, Jesse (Brittany O'Grady)
Debris, Nicole Hegmann (Sarah Desjardins)
DMZ, Tenny (Sydney Park)
How to Marry a Millionaire (New Era Movies edition), Loco Dempsey (Betty Grable)
The Map of Tiny Perfect Things, Margaret (Kathryn Newton)
Ms. Marvel, Nakia Bahadir (Yasmeen Fletcher)
Pretty Little Liars: Original Sin, Noa Olivar (Maia Reficco)
Resident Evil: Welcome to Raccoon City, Claire Redfield (Kaya Scodelario)
St. Elmo's Fire (2022 The Cinema edition), Julianna "Jules" Van Patten (Demi Moore)

Animation
The Boss Baby: Family Business, Glue Baby
Playmobil: The Movie, Dr. Greta Grim

Notes

References

External links 
 Official agency profile 
 

1993 births
21st-century Japanese actresses
Japanese people of Egyptian descent
Japanese video game actresses
Japanese voice actresses
Living people
Manga artists from Tokyo
Seiyu Award winners
Voice actresses from Tokyo